The United States recognized the government of King Ibn Saud in 1931, but it was not until 1939 when it appointed its first U.S. ambassador to Saudi Arabia, Bert Fish, then resident in Cairo and ambassador to Egypt. Fish made one trip down to Jeddah in 1940 to meet the King and present his credentials, but it was not until after his mission was terminated that a legation was established there on May 1, 1942. The position was most recently occupied by John Abizaid from June 16, 2019 to January 20, 2021. He presented his credentials to King Salman on June 16, 2019.

Ambassadors

Notes

See also
 Saudi Arabia–United States relations
 Ambassadors of the United States
 Embassy of Saudi Arabia, Washington, D.C.
 Ambassadors of Saudi Arabia to the United States

References
United States Department of State: Background notes on Saudi Arabia

External links
 United States Department of State: Chiefs of Mission for Saudi Arabia
 United States Department of State: Saudi Arabia
 United States Embassy in Riyadh

 
Saudi Arabia
United States